Richard Bertie may refer to:
 Richard Bertie (courtier) (c. 1517–1582), husband of Katherine Willoughby, duchess of Suffolk
 Richard Bertie (soldier) (c. 1635–1686), English soldier and member of Parliament
 Richard Bertie, 14th Earl of Lindsey (born 1931), British peer